Herminio Masantonio (5 August 1910 – 11 September 1956) was an Argentine football centre-forward. He played most of his career for Huracán and represented Argentina at international level.

Masantonio is one of Huracán's legends, being the all-time top scorer of the club. Besides, he is placed 3rd. in the list of Argentine Primera División top scorers with 253 goals in 358 matches. Despite those outstanding marks, Masantonio was never top scorer of an individual season. He didn't win any official title with Huracán, either.

Biography 
Born in Ensenada in 1910, Masantonio started his career in Villa Albino Sportivo, that was affiliated to La Plata football league, where he debuted in the fourth division in 1926. Three years later, Masantonio moved to Club Platense of the same league, where he started to show his scoring skills.

Apart from football, Masantonio was a boxing enthusiast and wished to make a career in the sport. Nevertheless, Lieutenant Tomás Ducó, member of C.A. Huracán (he would be later president of club) had been informed about Masantonio's potential for football so he convinced him to play for the club. Masantonio signed his first contract for Huracán, starting his career at the very dawn of the professional era of Argentine football in 1931. He scored two goals to Quilmes in his debut for Huracán, which thrashed the Cervecero 5–1.

In his inaugural season in Primera División, Masantonio scored 23 goals. He was a skilled centreforward but sometimes he tended to abuse dribbling. A journalist stated that Masantonio "was a centroforward that is Bernabé Ferreyra when he is 40 metres to the goal, and Nolo Ferreira when he is three metres", making a word name with both stars' surnames and comparing their different styles of playing.

By 1939, Masantonio used to switch positions on the field, sometimes ocupping defensive positions or placing as centrehalf. That caused him to be punished by Huracán executives, alleging that "they have hired him to score goals". In 1941, Masantonio was seconded by prominent players such as Norberto Méndez, Llamil Simes, and Delfín Unzué. In 1937, 1939 and 1940 were the years when Masantonio scored most goals (28 each).

Masantonio stayed with Huracán until 1943 when he left the club as a free agent, joining Uruguayan club Defensor at 34 years old. He soon returned to Argentina to play for Banfield in 1944 (only one match in Primera División, where he scored two goals) before retiring after one last season with Huracán (having played 5 matches, with 5 goals scored).

Masantonio scored 246 goals for Huracán making him the club's highest scoring player. He scored a total of 259 goals in 369 games for all of his club teams.

Masantonio represented Argentina at the 1935 and 1942 South American Championships. He was topscorer in both competitions as Argentina finished second in both tournaments; his 11 goals in the competition leave him in 13th place in the list of Copa América topscorers.

Masantonio scored a total of 21 goals for Argentina in only 19 games, putting him in 11th place in the table of Argentina's top goalscorers.

At only 46 years old, Masantonio died of cancer on September 11, 1956 at the Hospital Rawson. The funeral was held in Club Huracán. Since then, Masantonio has received several tributes, including a monument (inaugurated in March 1996 in front of the club headquarters on Avenida Caseros) and a street with his name in Parque Patricios. Masantonio was the inspiration for an Argentine tango titled El Mortero del Globito, written by Miguel Padula (music) and Francisco García Jiménez. recorded on 9 May 1933 by the Orquesta Típica Victor, featuring Alberto Gómez on vocals. Another song dedicated to Masantonio was El Pampero de Patricios.

Titles 
Argentina
 Copa Lipton: 1937

Individual
 Copa América Top-scorer: 1935, 1942

References

1910 births
1956 deaths
Sportspeople from Buenos Aires Province
Argentine people of Italian descent
Argentine footballers
Association football forwards
Club Atlético Huracán footballers
Defensor Sporting players
Club Atlético Banfield footballers
Argentine Primera División players
Uruguayan Primera División players
Argentine expatriate footballers
Expatriate footballers in Uruguay
Argentina international footballers
Copa América-winning players
Burials at La Chacarita Cemetery